is a passenger railway station in located in the city of Zushi, Kanagawa, Japan, operated by East Japan Railway Company (JR East).

Lines
Higashi-Zushi  Station is served by the Yokosuka Line. It is located 10.4 km from the Ōfuna switch point, and 59.8 km from Tokyo Station.

Station layout
The station consists of two opposed side platforms connected to the station building by a footbridge. The station is staffed.

Platforms

History
Higashi-Zushi Station opened on April 1, 1952 as a station on Japan National Railways (JNR). The station came under the management of JR East upon the privatization of the Japan National Railways (JNR) on April 1, 1987. Station operations are now managed by the East Japan Eco Access Co., Ltd under contract from JR East.

Passenger statistics
In fiscal 2019, the station was used by an average of 4,944 passengers daily (boarding passengers only).

The passenger figures (boarding passengers only) for previous years are as shown below.

Surrounding area
Sakurayama Central Park
Daiichi Sports Park

See also
List of railway stations in Japan

References

External links

 JR East Station information (JR East) 

Railway stations in Kanagawa Prefecture
Railway stations in Japan opened in 1952
Yokosuka Line
Zushi, Kanagawa